The white-browed laughingthrush (Pterorhinus sannio) is a bird in the family Leiothrichidae. The species was first described by Robert Swinhoe in 1867. It is found in China, Hong Kong, India, Laos, Myanmar, Thailand, and Vietnam.

This species was formerly placed in the genus Garrulax but following the publication of a comprehensive molecular phylogenetic study in 2018, it was moved to the resurrected genus Pterorhinus.

References

External links
Image at ADW

white-browed laughingthrush
Birds of South China
Birds of Northeast India
Birds of Laos
Birds of Myanmar
Birds of Yunnan
white-browed laughingthrush
Taxonomy articles created by Polbot
Taxobox binomials not recognized by IUCN